Ogdensburg is a borough in Sussex County, in the U.S. state of New Jersey. As of the 2020 United States census, the borough's population was 2,258, a decrease of 152 (−6.3%) from the 2010 census count of 2,410, which in turn reflected a decline of 228 (−8.6%) from the 2,638 counted at the 2000 census.

The borough was formed based on an Act of the New Jersey Legislature on February 26, 1914, from part of Sparta Township, subject to the results of a referendum held on March 31, 1914. Ogdensburg is named after its first settler, Robert Ogden.

New Jersey Monthly magazine ranked Ogdensburg as its 27th best place to live in its 2008 rankings of the "Best Places To Live" in New Jersey.

Geography
According to the United States Census Bureau, the borough had a total area of 2.25 square miles (5.82 km2), including 2.20 square miles (5.71 km2) of land and 0.04 square miles (0.11 km2) of water (1.96%).

Unincorporated communities, localities and place names located partially or completely within the borough include Heaters Pond, South Ogdensburg and Sterling Hill.

Ogdensburg borders the Sussex County municipalities of Franklin, Hardyston Township and Sparta Township.

Ogdensburgite, an arsenate mineral, was named after the borough.

Demographics

2010 census

The Census Bureau's 2006–2010 American Community Survey showed that (in 2010 inflation-adjusted dollars) median household income was $78,333 (with a margin of error of +/− $11,582) and the median family income was $87,656 (+/− $10,522). Males had a median income of $66,860 (+/− $3,252) versus $41,900 (+/− $6,659) for females. The per capita income for the borough was $29,447 (+/− $3,151). About 10.2% of families and 8.5% of the population were below the poverty line, including 8.0% of those under age 18 and 14.0% of those age 65 or over.

2000 census
As of the 2000 United States census there were 2,638 people, 881 households, and 704 families residing in the borough. The population density was 1,154.7 people per square mile (446.7/km2). There were 903 housing units at an average density of 395.3 per square mile (152.9/km2). The racial makeup of the borough was 97.54% White, 0.15% African American, 0.04% Native American, 0.72% Asian, 0.27% from other races, and 1.29% from two or more races. Hispanic or Latino of any race were 4.17% of the population.

There were 881 households, out of which 43.0% had children under the age of 18 living with them, 66.6% were married couples living together, 9.3% had a female householder with no husband present, and 20.0% were non-families. 16.6% of all households were made up of individuals, and 5.9% had someone living alone who was 65 years of age or older. The average household size was 2.99 and the average family size was 3.38.

In the borough the population was spread out, with 29.5% under the age of 18, 7.5% from 18 to 24, 31.0% from 25 to 44, 23.9% from 45 to 64, and 8.0% who were 65 years of age or older. The median age was 35 years. For every 100 females, there were 102.5 males. For every 100 females age 18 and over, there were 98.9 males.

The median income for a household in the borough was $60,313, and the median income for a family was $70,521. Males had a median income of $47,350 versus $35,060 for females. The per capita income for the borough was $24,305. About 4.8% of families and 5.7% of the population were below the poverty line, including 9.6% of those under age 18 and 7.1% of those age 65 or over.

Government

Local government
Ogdensburg is governed under the Borough form of New Jersey municipal government, which is used in 218 municipalities (of the 564) statewide, making it the most common form of government in New Jersey. The governing body is comprised of the Mayor and the Borough Council, with all positions elected at-large on a partisan basis as part of the November general election. The Mayor is elected directly by the voters to a four-year term of office. The Borough Council is comprised of six members elected to serve three-year terms on a staggered basis, with two seats coming up for election each year in a three-year cycle. The Borough form of government used by Ogdensburg is a "weak mayor / strong council" government in which council members act as the legislative body with the mayor presiding at meetings and voting only in the event of a tie. The mayor can veto ordinances subject to an override by a two-thirds majority vote of the council. The mayor makes committee and liaison assignments for council members, and most appointments are made by the mayor with the advice and consent of the council.

, the Mayor of Ogdensburg Borough is Republican George P. Hutnick, whose term of office ends December 31, 2022. Members of the Ogdenburg Borough Council are Council President Brenda Cowdrick (R, 2022), Nelson R. Alvarez (R, 2024), Alfonse DeMeo (R, 2023), Anthony Nasisi (R, 2022), Michael Nardini (D, 2023) and Kenneth Poyer (R, 2024).

In June 2019, Nelson Alvarez was appointed to fill the seat expiring in December 2021 that had been held by David Astor. In the November 2019 general election, Alavarez was elected to serve the balance of the term of office.

In December 2019, Juan Cruz was appointed to fill the balance of the term expiring in December 2020 that had been held by Peter G. Opilla until he left office.

Federal, state, and county representation
Ogdensburg is located in the 7th Congressional District and is part of New Jersey's 24th state legislative district. 

 

Sussex County is governed by a Board of County Commissioners whose five members are elected at-large in partisan elections on a staggered basis, with either one or two seats coming up for election each year. At an annual reorganization meeting held in the beginning of January, the board selects a Commissioner Director and Deputy Director from among its members, with day-to-day supervision of the operation of the county delegated to a County Administrator. , Sussex County's Commissioners are 
Commissioner Director Anthony Fasano (R, Hopatcong, term as commissioner and as commissioner director ends December 31, 2022), 
Deputy Director Chris Carney (R, Frankford Township, term as commissioner ends 2024; term as deputy director ends 2022), 
Dawn Fantasia (R, Franklin, 2024), 
Jill Space (R, Wantage Township, 2022; appointed to serve an unexpired term) and 
Herbert Yardley (R, Stillwater Township, 2023). In May 2022, Jill Space was appointed to fill the seat expiring in December 2022 that had been held by Sylvia Petillo until she resigned from office.

Constitutional officers elected on a countywide basis are 
County Clerk Jeffrey M. Parrott (R, Wantage Township, 2026),
Sheriff Michael F. Strada (R, Hampton Township, 2022) and 
Surrogate Gary R. Chiusano (R, Frankford Township, 2023). The County Administrator is Gregory V. Poff II, whose appointment expires in 2025.

Politics
As of March 2011, there were a total of 1,634 registered voters in Ogdenburg, of which 311 (19.0% vs. 16.5% countywide) were registered as Democrats, 564 (34.5% vs. 39.3%) were registered as Republicans and 757 (46.3% vs. 44.1%) were registered as Unaffiliated. There were 2 voters registered as either Libertarians or Greens. Among the borough's 2010 Census population, 67.8% (vs. 65.8% in Sussex County) were registered to vote, including 89.8% of those ages 18 and over (vs. 86.5% countywide).

In the 2012 presidential election, Republican Mitt Romney received 636 votes (56.4% vs. 59.4% countywide), ahead of Democrat Barack Obama with 463 votes (41.1% vs. 38.2%) and other candidates with 24 votes (2.1% vs. 2.1%), among the 1,127 ballots cast by the borough's 1,616 registered voters, for a turnout of 69.7% (vs. 68.3% in Sussex County). In the 2008 presidential election, Republican John McCain received 709 votes (57.5% vs. 59.2% countywide), ahead of Democrat Barack Obama with 483 votes (39.2% vs. 38.7%) and other candidates with 25 votes (2.0% vs. 1.5%), among the 1,233 ballots cast by the borough's 1,622 registered voters, for a turnout of 76.0% (vs. 76.9% in Sussex County). In the 2004 presidential election, Republican George W. Bush received 728 votes (64.3% vs. 63.9% countywide), ahead of Democrat John Kerry with 378 votes (33.4% vs. 34.4%) and other candidates with 21 votes (1.9% vs. 1.3%), among the 1,132 ballots cast by the borough's 1,513 registered voters, for a turnout of 74.8% (vs. 77.7% in the whole county).

In the 2013 gubernatorial election, Republican Chris Christie received 71.9% of the vote (520 cast), ahead of Democrat Barbara Buono with 25.9% (187 votes), and other candidates with 2.2% (16 votes), among the 731 ballots cast by the borough's 1,594 registered voters (8 ballots were spoiled), for a turnout of 45.9%. In the 2009 gubernatorial election, Republican Chris Christie received 491 votes (63.8% vs. 63.3% countywide), ahead of Democrat Jon Corzine with 191 votes (24.8% vs. 25.7%), Independent Chris Daggett with 71 votes (9.2% vs. 9.1%) and other candidates with 8 votes (1.0% vs. 1.3%), among the 770 ballots cast by the borough's 1,585 registered voters, yielding a 48.6% turnout (vs. 52.3% in the county).

Education
The Ogdensburg Borough School District serves students in public school for pre-kindergarten through eighth grade at Ogdensburg School. As of the 2018–19 school year, the district, comprised of one school, had an enrollment of 236 students and 23.5 classroom teachers (on an FTE basis), for a student–teacher ratio of 10.0:1.

For ninth through twelfth grades, public school students attend Wallkill Valley Regional High School which also serves students from Franklin Borough, Hardyston Township and Hamburg Borough, and is part of the Wallkill Valley Regional High School District. As of the 2018–19 school year, the high school had an enrollment of 604 students and 56.0 classroom teachers (on an FTE basis), for a student–teacher ratio of 10.8:1. Seats on the high school district's nine-member board of education are allocated based on the population of the constituent municipalities, with one seat assigned to Ogdensburg.

Students in Ogdensburg and all of Sussex County are eligible to apply to attend Sussex County Technical School in Sparta Township, which is open to students from all of the county.

Transportation

Roads and highways

No Interstate, U.S. or state highways run through Ogdensburg. The most significant roadway serving the borough is County Route 517.

Public transportation
The county provides Skylands Ride bus service operating between Sussex and Newton.

Historic sites

Ogdensburg is home to the following locations on the National Register of Historic Places:
 Sterling Hill Mining Museum – 30 Plant Street (added 1991)
 In the late 19th Century, Thomas A. Edison built the Edison Ore-Milling Company in Ogdensburg to enable production of iron from low grade ores using an electromagnetic process. The process proved unsuccessful on a production scale.

Notable people

People who were born in, residents of, or otherwise closely associated with Ogdensburg include:

 Jason Davis (born 1974), record executive

References

Further reading

 McCabe, Wayne T. and Kate Gordon. A Penny A View...An Album of Postcard Views...Ogdensburg, N.J. (Newton, NJ: Historic Preservation Alternatives, 1999).
 Truran, William R. Franklin, Hamburg, Ogdensburg, and Hardyston (Images of America). (Charleston, SC: Arcadia Publishing, 2004).
 Truran, William R. Mining for America: the Franklin-Sterling Hill, N.J. Zinc; The Fluorescent Mineral Capital of the World. (Sparta, NJ: Trupower Press, 2006).

External links

 Borough website

 
1914 establishments in New Jersey
Borough form of New Jersey government
Boroughs in Sussex County, New Jersey
Populated places established in 1914
Wallkill River